BLX may refer to:

 Bloxwich railway station (National Rail station code BLX)
 Belluno Airport (IATA code BLX)
 TUIfly Nordic airline (ICAO code BLX)
 Banco Latinoamericano de Comercio Exterior